Anneliese Seonbuchner (13 September 1929 – 28 November 2020) was a German hurdler. She competed in the women's 80 metres hurdles at the 1952 Summer Olympics.

References

External links
 

1929 births
2020 deaths
Athletes (track and field) at the 1952 Summer Olympics
German female hurdlers
Olympic athletes of Germany
Place of birth missing